These are the songs that reached number one on the Top 100 Best Sellers chart in 1963 as published by Cash Box magazine.

See also
1963 in music
List of Hot 100 number-one singles of 1963 (U.S.)

References
https://web.archive.org/web/20110818052122/http://cashboxmagazine.com/archives/60s_files/1963.html

1963
1963 record charts
1963 in American music